The pool stage of the 2009–10 Heineken Cup was the opening phase of the annual competition, in which 24 teams were arranged into six pools contesting of four teams each and then competed in a home-and-away double round robin. Eight teams, specifically the six pool winners and the two best runners-up, qualified for the quarter-finals, starting a knock-out phase that will end with the final at Stade de France in the Paris suburb of Saint-Denis.

For the first time, the third- through fifth-ranking runners-up parachuted into the knockout stage of the European Challenge Cup. Also for the first time, the winner of the Heineken Cup will receive an automatic berth in the following season's competition. The draw for the pools took place on 9 June 2009 in Paris.

Seeding within pools
The seeding system was the same as in the 2008–09 tournament. The 24 competing teams were ranked based on past Heineken Cup and European Challenge Cup performance, with each pool receiving one team from each quartile, or Tier. The requirement to have only one team per country in each pool, however, still applied (with the exception of the inclusion of the seventh English team).

The brackets show each team's European Rugby Club Ranking at the start of the 2009–10 season.

Seeding for the knockout phase
The winners of each of the six pools were seeded 1 to 6 first by competition points, then tries scored, and finally score difference. The runners-up were similarly sorted, and the best two were seeded seven and eight and progressed to the quarter-finals alongside the six winners. The top four seeds are given home matches in the quarter-finals, with seed 1 playing seed 8, seed 2 playing seed 7, etc.

After the two second-place teams advancing to the Heineken Cup quarter-finals were determined, the next three second-place finishers parachuted into the quarter-finals of the Amlin Challenge Cup. These teams became the 5th through 7th seeds in the Challenge Cup knockout phase, and played their quarter-finals away.

Pools
{| class="wikitable"
|+ Key to colours
|-
|bgcolor="#ccffcc"|    
|Winner of each pool,advance to quarterfinals. Seed # in parentheses
|-
|bgcolor="#ccccff"|    
|Two highest-scoring second-place teams,advance to quarterfinals. Seed # in parentheses.
|-
|bgcolor="#ffffcc"|    
|Third- through fifth-highest-scoring second-place teamsparachute into the knockout stage of the European Challenge Cup.Seed # in brackets [ ].
|}

Pool 1

Pool 2

 This match was moved to the Scarlets' home ground due to a frozen pitch at the Dragons' home of Rodney Parade.

Pool 3

Pool 4

 This match was originally scheduled to be held at King Baudouin Stadium in Brussels, but heavy snowfall forced it to be moved to Paris.

Pool 5

Pool 6

 Scarlets win the tiebreaker over London Irish by virtue of a head-to-head sweep.

Seeding and runners-up
 Bare numbers indicate Heineken Cup quarter-final seeding.
 Numbers with "C" indicate Challenge Cup quarter-final seeding.

See also
 2009-10 Heineken Cup

References

External links
Official ERC website

Pool Stage
Heineken Cup pool stages